is a former Japanese football player.

Club statistics

References

External links

1984 births
Living people
Hosei University alumni
Association football people from Niigata Prefecture
Japanese footballers
J2 League players
Japan Football League players
Yokohama FC players
Tokyo Verdy players
Matsumoto Yamaga FC players
FC Ryukyu players
Association football defenders